Locustopsis is an extinct genus of grasshopper in the family Locustopsidae.

The Paleobiology Database lists the following species as accepted within Locustopsis:

 Locustopsis africanus
 Locustopsis anatolica
 Locustopsis apicalis
 Locustopsis bernstorffi
 Locustopsis bucklandi
 Locustopsis cockerelli
 Locustopsis constricta
 Locustopsis cubitalis
 Locustopsis dubia
 Locustopsis elegans
 Locustopsis elongata
 Locustopsis ferghanensis
 Locustopsis germari
 Locustopsis gracilis
 Locustopsis gyra
 Locustopsis karatavica
 Locustopsis lacera
 Locustopsis lacoei
 Locustopsis latipennis
 Locustopsis maculosa
 Locustopsis mecklenburgica
 Locustopsis nana
 Locustopsis picta
 Locustopsis posterior
 Locustopsis procera
 Locustopsis pulchella
 Locustopsis reducta
 Locustopsis rhytofemoralis
 Locustopsis shurabica
 Locustopsis sippeli
 Locustopsis spectabilis
 Locustopsis uvarovi

References 

Caelifera
Insects described in 1906
Prehistoric insect genera